2,4,6-Trinitroaniline, C6H4N4O6, abbreviated as TNA and also known as picramide, a nitrated amine. Materials in this group range from slight to strong oxidizing agents. If mixed with reducing agents, including hydrides, sulfides and nitrides, they may begin a vigorous reaction that culminates in a detonation. The aromatic nitro compounds may explode in the presence of a base such as sodium hydroxide or potassium hydroxide even in the presence of water or organic solvents. The explosive tendencies of aromatic nitro compounds are increased by the presence of multiple nitro groups. The appearance of trinitroaniline varies from yellow to orange to red depending on its purity and concentration.

Applications/Uses
Trinitroaniline is only used in modern times in the small warheads of some explosive devices such as mortars. In World War II it was used by Imperial Japanese Navy as Type 97 bakuyaku (Model 1931 explosive) in some versions of gun projectiles instead of less stable burster schimose. It was also used in the Yokosuka MXY-7 Ohka, a kamikaze antishipping human-guided rocket aircraft.

Health and safety
Trinitroaniline is dangerously explosive. Symptoms of exposure to this compound may include skin and eye irritation, headache, drowsiness, weakness, cyanosis, and respiratory distress.

References

See also
 Aniline
 Picric acid
 Tetryl

Anilines
Nitrobenzenes
Explosive chemicals